Amda Seyon II  was Emperor of Ethiopia briefly during 1494, and a member of the Solomonic dynasty. He was the infant son of Eskender, and a second wife of Eskender's father Baeda Maryam I.

Amda Seyon quickly became the pawn in the struggle for control of the throne, which ended in his death, and the ascension of Na'od. As Taddesse Tamrat writes, "Amda-Seyon's reign lasted for only six months, and even the hagiographer betrays a sense of great relief at the announcement of his death."

Notes

1487 births
1494 deaths
15th-century monarchs in Africa
15th-century emperors of Ethiopia
Solomonic dynasty
Monarchs who died as children
Child monarchs from sub-Saharan Africa